Fazle Hossain Badsha (born 15 October 1952), is a Bangladeshi politician. He has served as a member of the Jatiyo Sangshad since 2008, representing Rajshahi-2 for the Workers Party of Bangladesh.

Background
Fazle Hossain Badsha is a lawyer by profession.

References 

Living people
1952 births
Workers Party of Bangladesh politicians
Bangladeshi communists
20th-century Bangladeshi lawyers
9th Jatiya Sangsad members
10th Jatiya Sangsad members
11th Jatiya Sangsad members